Beyond the Grave may refer to:

 Afterlife, a continued existence after death
 Beyond the Grave (Gungrave), the protagonist of the Gungrave series
 Beyond the Grave (novel), a 2009 novel by Jude Watson

See also
 Beyond the Gravy, a BBC Radio 4 programme
 From Beyond the Grave, a 1974 British film